Nebria finissima is a species of ground beetle in the Nebriinae subfamily that is endemic to Turkey.

References

finissima
Beetles described in 1990
Beetles of Asia
Endemic fauna of Turkey